Nicolás Martinez (born 25 September 1987), known simply as Nico, is an Argentine professional footballer who plays as a midfielder for Greek Super League 2 club Apollon Smyrnis.

His brother is the footballer Juan Manuel Martínez.

Club career
Martinez was formed in the youth system of Vélez Sarfield, in 2008 he was loaned to Almirante Brown a team in third category of Argentina. In 2009, he joined Independiente but he did not make his first team debut until the year 2010. On 19 December 2010, Martínez scored in 4–2 victory over Defensor Sporting in the Copa Sudamericana 2010, helping Independiente advance to the quarter finals. In 2011, he left Independiente and signed with Santiago Wanderers of Chile.

In Santiago Wanderers is overshadowed by Tressor Moreno who held the same post in the field. The departure of the Colombian player gave him the chance to play a vital role for the club in Apertura 2012. When the year ends Santiago Wanderers did not take advantage of the purchase option and Martinez returned to Independiente.

On August 1, 2012, is signed to Real Murcia. It started well gaining his role in the starting XI. In his second day in the club at Estadio El Molinon against Sporting Gijon scored a wonderful goal putting his name in the scoreboard. This match was eventually won by Real Murcia, but gradually the club lost the title. Eventually during the season lost his place and remained on the bench. He concluded his contract with the club in July 2013. On August 8, 2013, he signed for a year contract with San Martín de San Juan.

Panetolikos
On January 17, 2014, he signed a contract with Panetolikos and will play at Greek Super League till the summer of 2015. In September 2014, Martinez expands his contract with the club till the summer of 2016.

The 27-year-old Argentine playmaker has been in excellent form since the start of the 2014/15 season and AEK are chasing his signature.  AEK will consider to make a bid after the end of the season and the possibility of completing this transfer is highly likely as the two clubs share an amicable relationship. Branco Milovanovic, AEK's technical director, is in contact with Martinez's agent and it is likely that an offer to land Panetolikos attacking midfielder is on the cards. On the other hand, the Argentinian midfielder is linked with the Greek champion Olympiakos.According to Goal newspaper Panetolikos have accepted a bid in the region of  €600,000, as Olympiakos manager Vitor Pereira is a big admirer of Martinez.

Olympiacos
On 2 July 2015, Martinez signed a 4 years' contract with Greek champions Olympiakos for over €600,000.

Loan to Anorthosis
A month after he signed a year contract for Cypriot First Division club Anorthosis Famagusta on loan from Olympiakos. Negotiations between the two clubs had finalized with media reports suggesting that the player will spend the season on loan at the club and that Anorthosis Famagusta FC  will foot €200,000 of his €350,000 per year salary. According to club sources, a player of Martinez's quality was what was missing last season when Anorthosis Famagusta just about missed out on Europe after finish fifth at the end of the 2014–15 season. He finished the year as the udisputable leader of the club, but they still finish fifth.

Loan to Western Sydney Wanderers
On 31 August 2016, in the last day of the summer transfer window, Western Sydney Wanderers have reportedly come to terms with 28-year-old Argentinian attacking midfielder and signed him on a long season loan from Greek Super League club Olympiakos. As part of the loan deal with Western Sydney sources say that out of his current wages of $563,000 a season, the Wanderers have agreed to pay about $266,000 while Olympiakos will foot the remainder. Tony Popovic the coach of the club has placed his faith after signing on loan from Olympiakos. “When I came here the other players had been training for two months – I had quickly to get used to the players and the intensity. Here they work very hard, it’s not like in South America where sometimes if you are not fit you can still play football. Here it is very physical” Martinez said after his first training with the new club. On 6 November 2016, he scored the fastest goal in Wanderers Hyundai A-League history to put the visitors in front inside the first minute, in a 2–2 away draw against Perth Glory.

Loan to Apollon Limassol
On 31 August 2017, he signed a year contract for Cypriot First Division club Apollon Limassol on a long season loan from Olympiakos.
On 18 September 2017, he scored his first goal with the club in a 4–2 home win game against Ermis Aradippou.

Aris
On 27 August 2018, newly promoted Aris has taken out-of-favour Argentinian midfielder Martinez as a free transfer from Olympiacos by signing a year contract for an undisclosed fee. Martinez is surplus to the requirements of the club, and travels to Thessaloniki to strength Aris’ deepening roster. His first goal came in a disappointing 4–1 away loss against Olympiacos, on 10 March 2019. On 31 March 2019, he came in as a substitute and scored in the dying minutes of the game, sealing a 3–1 home win against OFI. On 21 April 2019, he scored with a tap-in in a 2–1 away win against Panetolikos, but he didn't celebrate as a token of appreciation for his old club.

Honours
Individual

Super League Greece Team of the Year: 2014–15

References

External links
 

1987 births
Living people
Argentine footballers
Argentine expatriate footballers
Club Atlético Independiente footballers
Santiago Wanderers footballers
Real Murcia players
Panetolikos F.C. players
Anorthosis Famagusta F.C. players
Apollon Limassol FC players
Aris Thessaloniki F.C. players
Volos N.F.C. players
Chilean Primera División players
Argentine Primera División players
Segunda División players
Super League Greece players
Cypriot First Division players
A-League Men players
Expatriate footballers in Chile
Expatriate footballers in Spain
Expatriate footballers in Greece
Expatriate footballers in Cyprus
Argentine expatriate sportspeople in Spain
Argentine expatriate sportspeople in Cyprus
Argentine expatriate sportspeople in Greece
Argentine expatriate sportspeople in Australia
People from Viedma
Association football midfielders
Western Sydney Wanderers FC players
Olympiacos F.C. players
Marquee players (A-League Men)